Bianca Narea (born 30 November 1986) is a Romanian alpine skier. She competed in the women's giant slalom at the 2006 Winter Olympics.

References

1986 births
Living people
Romanian female alpine skiers
Olympic alpine skiers of Romania
Alpine skiers at the 2006 Winter Olympics
Sportspeople from Brașov